Miturga is a genus of spiders in the family Miturgidae. It was first described in 1870 by Thorell. , it contains 17 species, all from Australia.

Species

Miturga comprises the following species:
Miturga agelenina Simon, 1909
Miturga albopunctata Hickman, 1930
Miturga annulipes (Lucas, 1844)
Miturga australiensis (L. Koch, 1873)
Miturga catograpta Simon, 1909
Miturga fagei Kolosváry, 1934
Miturga ferina Simon, 1909
Miturga gilva L. Koch, 1872
Miturga impedita Simon, 1909
Miturga lineata Thorell, 1870
Miturga necator (Walckenaer, 1837)
Miturga occidentalis Simon, 1909
Miturga parva Hogg, 1914
Miturga severa Simon, 1909
Miturga splendens Hickman, 1930
Miturga thorelli Simon, 1909
Miturga whistleri Simon, 1909

References

Miturgidae
Araneomorphae genera
Spiders of Australia